Parapoynx restingalis is a moth in the family Crambidae. It is found in Brazil (Rio de Janeiro, Bahia). The habitat consists of marshes with sand dune vegetation.

The larvae feed on the floating leaves of Nymphoides humboldtianum and Nymphaea ampla.

References

Moths described in 1990
Acentropinae